Sara Bakri (born 1 November 1989) is a Lebanese footballer and futsal player who plays as a midfielder for Lebanese club BFA. She represented Lebanon internationally in both football and futsal.

With seven goals in 22 appearances between 2006 and 2017, Bakri is the Lebanon national football team's all-time top goalscorer and joint-most capped player.

Early life 
Born on 1 November 1989, in Beirut, Lebanon, Bakri has two sisters and a brother. She began playing football at the age of seven.

Club career 
Bakri played at Sadaka in the Lebanese Women's Football League from 2008 to 2014, before moving to SAS. She joined BFA on 30 September 2019.

International career
Bakri has been capped for Lebanon at senior level in both football and futsal.

In football, she represented Lebanon in multiple competitions, namely the 2010 Arabia Women's Cup and the 2014 AFC Women's Asian Cup qualification in 2013, where she played three games and scored a goal against Kuwait. Bakri scored seven goals in 22 games between 2006 and 2017; she is her national team's joint-most capped player, alongside Taghrid Hamadeh, and all-time top goalscorer.

In futsal, Bakri played for Lebanon at the WAFF Women's Futsal Championship in 2008 and 2012, and the AFC Women's Futsal Championship in 2018.

Career statistics

International
Scores and results list Lebanon's goal tally first, score column indicates score after each Bakri goal.

Honours
Sadaka
 Lebanese Women's Football League: 2007–08, 2008–09, 2009–10, 2010–11, 2011–12, 2012–13
 Lebanese Women's FA Cup: 2007–08, 2008–09, 2009–10, 2010–11, 2011–12

SAS
 Lebanese Women's Football League: 2014–15, 2015–16, 2016–17, 2018–19
 Lebanese Women's FA Cup: 2014–15, 2018–19; runner-up: 2016–17, 2017–18
 Lebanese Women's Super Cup: 2016; runner-up: 2017, 2018

Lebanon
 WAFF Women's Championship third place: 2007

Individual
 Lebanon all-time top goalscorer: 7 goals

See also
 List of top international women's football goal scorers by country
 List of Lebanon women's international footballers

References

External links
 
 
 

1989 births
Living people
Footballers from Beirut
Lebanese women's footballers
Lebanese women's futsal players
Women's association football midfielders
Lebanon women's international footballers
Lebanese Women's Football League players
Sadaka SC women's footballers
Stars Association for Sports players
Beirut Football Academy players